Xu Guoliang (born February 1965) is a Chinese molecular geneticist. He is a professor at the Shanghai Institute of Biochemistry and Cell Biology and an academician of the Chinese Academy of Sciences.

Biography 
Xu graduated from Hangzhou University Department of Biology in 1985, and obtained his master's degree at Institute of Genetics and Developmental Biology, Chinese Academy of Sciences in 1989. In 1993 he earned his Ph.D. from Max Planck Institute for Molecular Genetics and the Technical University of Berlin.

Xu's research mainly focuses on the epigenetic regulation. In 2011 his group discovered that the DNA oxidative demethylation is mediated by DNA oxidase TET and glycosidase TDG, and clarified its role in the canceration of the cells. In 2014, he published his study concerning the effect of DNA methylation and histone modification.

In 2013, Xu was awarded the TWAS Prize "for his contribution to the understanding of the role and mechanism of DNA oxidation in epigenetic regulation of mammalian development". He won the Tan Kah Kee award in 2014. In 2015, he was elected a member of the Chinese Academy of Sciences.

References

1965 births
Living people
Biologists from Zhejiang
Chinese geneticists
Educators from Shaoxing
Hangzhou University alumni
Members of the Chinese Academy of Sciences
People from Zhuji
Scientists from Shaoxing
Technical University of Berlin alumni
TWAS laureates
Zhejiang University alumni